The 2016 World Junior Table Tennis Championships were held in Cape Town, South Africa, from 30 November to 7 December 2016. It was organised by the South Africa Table Tennis Board (SATTB) under the auspices and authority of the International Table Tennis Federation (ITTF).

Medal summary

Events

Medal table

See also

2016 World Team Table Tennis Championships
2016 ITTF World Tour

References

World Junior Table Tennis Championships
World Junior Table Tennis Championships
World Junior Table Tennis Championships
World Junior Table Tennis Championships
Table tennis in South Africa
International sports competitions hosted by South Africa
World Junior Table Tennis Championships
World Junior Table Tennis Championships